The Rwanda men's national under-18 basketball team is a national basketball team of Rwanda, administered by the Fédération Rwandaise de Basketball Amateur "FERWABA".
It represents the country in international under-18 (under age 18) basketball competitions.

See also
Rwanda men's national basketball team
Rwanda men's national under-16 basketball team
Rwanda women's national under-18 basketball team

References

External links
Archived records of Rwanda team participations

Rwanda national basketball team
Men's national under-18 basketball teams